Kym Goldsworthy is an Australian screenwriter and script editor, best known for his work in television.

Select Credits
Hey Dad! (1988–94) - TV series
The Roly Poly Man (1994) - film
Bullpitt! (1997–98) - TV series
The Woodlies (2011–12) - TV series

References

External links

Australian screenwriters
Living people
Year of birth missing (living people)
Place of birth missing (living people)